Barney Ivan S. Clark (born 25 June 1993 in Hackney, London) is an English former actor, best known for his role in the 2005 film, Oliver Twist.

Early life
Clark began acting in school plays and appeared in the 2001 film Lawless Heart when he was eight. He attended Central Foundation Boys' School in Islington, London, and was in the yellow form.

In 2009, Clark stated he didn't wish to act anymore and would focus on working behind the camera for now.

In December 2011, Clark was sentenced to 14 months in prison for violent disorder after a rave he was attending was busted by the police.

Career
He successfully auditioned for the title role in the 2005 version of Oliver Twist, directed by Roman Polanski; 800 children had auditioned for the role. The film opened in September 2005 and Clark received positive reviews for his performance although the film was mostly considered a financial and critical disappointment.  When he was on the set of Oliver Twist he kept a diary every day.

His later projects included Savage Grace and short film Moog.

Filmography

References

External links

1993 births
Living people
People from Hackney Central
People educated at Central Foundation Boys' School
Alumni of the Anna Scher Theatre School
English male child actors
English male film actors
English male television actors